Baird Cottage is a historic cure cottage located at Saranac Lake in the town of Harrietstown, Franklin County, New York.  It was built in 1930 and is a two-story, side-gabled Colonial Revival style house based on a rectangular floor plan with a two-story end porch.  It sits on a concrete foundation and is sided in clapboard and asphalt shingles.

It was listed on the National Register of Historic Places in 1992.

References

Houses on the National Register of Historic Places in New York (state)
Colonial Revival architecture in New York (state)
Houses completed in 1930
Houses in Franklin County, New York
National Register of Historic Places in Franklin County, New York